Marvin Sapp (born January 28, 1967) is an American Gospel music singer-songwriter who recorded with the group Commissioned during the 1990s before beginning a record-breaking solo career.

Early life and education
Born and raised in Grand Rapids, Michigan, Sapp began singing in church at age four. He was a student at the unaccredited Aenon Bible College in Indianapolis, Indiana.

Solo career
In 1996, Sapp decided to establish himself as a contemporary gospel solo artist and has recorded seven albums. Sapp first achieved crossover fame with the release of "Never Would Have Made It" from the album Thirsty in 2007. It peaked at No. 14 on the U.S. Billboard Hot R&B/Hip-Hop Songs, No. 82 on the Billboard Hot 100, and also at No. 1 on the Billboard Hot Gospel Songs chart. Thirsty debuted at No. 28 on the U.S. Billboard 200, No. 4 on the U.S. Billboard Top R&B/Hip-Hop Albums, and also No. 1 on the U.S. Billboard Top Gospel Albums. It has been certified gold by the RIAA due to the album selling over 500,000 copies, making it Sapp's best selling album of his solo career, and has so far sold over 712,000 copies. In 2009, Sapp won all seven Gospel Stellar Awards that he was nominated for.

Sapp recorded Thirstys follow-up album, Here I Am, on October 16, 2009, at Resurrection Life Church in Wyoming, Michigan and released it on March 16, 2010. With its release, Sapp became the all-time highest charting gospel artist in Billboards 54-year history of tracking album sales. By selling approximately 76,000 copies of Here I Am its first week out, the album debuted at No. 2 on the Billboard 200 chart, making Here I Am the highest-charting album ever by a gospel artist. Here I Am'''s lead single, "The Best in Me," which was co-written by the album's producer, Aaron Lindsey (Israel Houghton), peaked at No. 14 on the Billboard Hot R&B/Hip-Hop Songs chart, No. 1 on Billboards Gospel Songs chart and reached No. 20 (with a bullet) on Billboards Urban AC chart.  On January 15, 2011, Marvin Sapp topped the list of winners during the 26th Annual Stellar Gospel Music Awards

Personal life
Sapp is the widower of MaLinda Sapp, who served as the administrative pastor at his Lighthouse Full Life Center Church. MaLinda died September 9, 2010, from complications of colon cancer.  

Biopic
In April 2022, it was revealed that there would be a biopic airing on TV One in August 2022 on Marvin Sapp, entitled after Marvin's top song, "Never Would've Made It: The Marvin Sapp Story". The biopic features Chaz Lamar Shepherd who portrays Marvin and Ambre Anderson portrays Marvin's late wife, Dr. MaLinda Sapp. 

Discography

 Marvin Sapp (1996)
 Grace & Mercy (1997)
 Nothing Else Matters (1999)
 I Believe (2002) 
 Diary of a Psalmist (2003)
 Be Exalted (2005)
 Thirsty (2007)
 Here I Am (2010)
 I Win (2012)
 You Shall Live (2015)
 Close (2017)
 Chosen Vessel (Live) (2020)
 Substance (2022)''

Achievements and awards

Billboard Music Awards

BET Awards

GMA Dove Awards

Grammy Awards
Marvin Sapp has been nominated for eleven Grammy Awards.

References

External links
Official Website

1967 births
Living people
African-American Christian clergy
African-American  male singer-songwriters
20th-century African-American male singers
American gospel singers
Musicians from Grand Rapids, Michigan
Singer-songwriters from Michigan
21st-century African-American male singers
Thirty Tigers artists